Pierre Louis Rodolphe Julian (13 June 1839 – 2 February 1907) born in Lapalud southeastern France was a French painter, etcher and professor, founder and director of the Académie Julian in Paris. The writer André Corthis (1882–1952), winner of the 1906 edition of the Prix Femina was his niece.

Biography 
Julian worked as an employee in a bookstore in Marseille. He was interested in sports, particularly wrestling.
Julian went to Paris, where he became a student of Léon Cogniet and  Alexandre Cabanel, professor at the École des Beaux-Arts, without being enrolled there.

In 1863 he exhibited for the first time in the salons.

He married the painter Amélie Beaury-Saurel in 1895.

The challenges that he faced when in Paris  led him to found in 1868,  a private art academy, the Académie Julian, who also offered  training to foreign artists and women  who had little access to the official academy .  The purpose was to  prepare students for entry to the École des Beaux-Arts. 
Julian was  described by the Anglo-Irish novelist and critic George Moore as "a kind of Hercules, dark-haired, strong, with broad shoulders, short legs, a soft voice and all the charm of the Midi".

Collections 
 San Francisco De Young (museum)
 British Museum

Award  
For his services to the arts, Rodolphe Julian Legion of Honour en 1881.

Bibliography 
 Léon Cladel; Jean-Pierre Deloux; Rodolphe Julian: "Ompdrailles : le tombeau-des-lutteurs", celebrating fighting tournaments   practiced in Lapalud (Vaucluse), Julian's birthplace 
 Martine Hérold: L'Académie Julian à cents ans. 1968 (in French).
 Catherine Fehrer; New Light on the Académie Julian and its founder (Rodolphe Julian). In: La Gazette des Beaux-Arts 6. Pér. 103, 1984

See also 
Académie Julian

References 

19th-century French painters
19th-century French engravers
19th-century French male artists
Academic staff of the Académie Julian
People from Vaucluse
1839 births
1907 deaths